Nicholas Andrew Basbanes (born May 25, 1943, in Lowell, Massachusetts) is an American author who writes and lectures about authors, books, and book culture. His subjects include the "eternal passion for books" (A Gentle Madness); the history and future of libraries (Patience & Fortitude); the "willful destruction of books" and the "determined effort to rescue them" (A Splendor of Letters); "the power of the printed word to stir the world" (Every Book Its Reader); the invention of paper and its effect on civilization (On Paper: The Everything of Its Two-Thousand-Year History) and an exploration of Longfellow's life and art (Cross of Snow: A Life of Henry Wadsworth Longfellow).

Early life and education 

Nicholas Basbanes is the son of two first-generation Greek-Americans. He graduated from Lowell High School in 1961 and earned a bachelor's degree in English from Bates College in Lewiston, Maine in 1965. Following a year of graduate study at Pennsylvania State University, he did research for his master's thesis in Washington, D.C. then entered U. S. Navy Officer Candidate School in Newport, Rhode Island. He attended the Defense Information School in the spring of 1968 and earned his master's degree in journalism in 1969 while serving aboard the aircraft carrier  during the first of two combat deployments he made to Yankee Station in the Gulf of Tonkin, off the coast of Vietnam.

Career

Early journalism 

Discharged from active duty in 1971, Basbanes went to work as a general assignment reporter for The Evening Gazette in Worcester, Massachusetts, specializing in investigative journalism. In 1978, he was appointed books editor of a sister publication, the Worcester Sunday Telegram, a full-time position that included writing a weekly column for which he interviewed more than a thousand authors over the next twenty-one years.

Due to cost cutting measures, the Telegram, then known as the Telegram & Gazette, removed its book section in 1990. When Basbanes left the newspaper later in 1991 to complete his first book, he continued writing the column and distributed it through Literary Features Syndicate, an agency he formed that placed it in more than thirty publications nationwide.

He writes the "Gently Mad" column for Fine Books & Collections magazine and lectures on book-related subjects.

Books 
Basbanes' first book, A Gentle Madness: Bibliophiles, Bibliomanes, and the Eternal Passion for Books, was published in 1995. The topic was originally dismissed as too arcane for a general readership by many New York editors who had passed on the opportunity to publish it, but the book later found sizable success with multiple printings. Michael Dirda of The Washington Post called it an "ingratiating and altogether enjoyable book", praising the book's "wonderful gallery of modern eccentrics" despite its occasional lapses in literary history. A Gentle Madness was named a New York Times notable book of the year and was a finalist for the National Book Critics Circle Award in nonfiction for 1995. In 2010, Allison Hoover Bartlett writing for the Wall Street Journal named it one of the most influential works about book collecting published in the twentieth century.

By 2003, with the publication of A Splendor of Letters, Basbanes was already acknowledged as a leading authority on books and book culture. One reviewer commented, "No other writer has traced the history of the book so thoroughly or so engagingly," and Yale University Press chose him to write its 2008 centennial history, A World of Letters, which chronicled the inside stories of its classic books from conception to production.

Basbanes' ninth book, On Paper: The Everything of Its Two-Thousand-Year History, is not only a consideration of paper as a principal medium for the transmission of text over the past ten centuries, but also a wider examination of the ubiquitous material itself. The eight-year project, which was released in October 2013, was supported in part by the award of a National Endowment for the Humanities Research Fellowship in 2008. It was named a notable book by the American Library Association, and was one of three finalists for the 2014 Andrew Carnegie Medal for Excellence in Nonfiction.

In July 2015, Basbanes received one of the inaugural grants from the Public Scholar program of the National Endowment for the Humanities in support of his tenth book, Cross of Snow: A Life of Henry Wadsworth Longfellow, published in 2020. The Public Scholar program is designed to promote the publication of scholarly nonfiction books for general audiences. Cross of Snow was named one of the best nonfiction books of 2020 by the Christian Science Monitor, one of the Books of the Year 2020 by TLS  and was selected as an Honors Book in the non-fiction category by the Massachusetts Center for the Book.

Archives 
The Cushing Memorial Library and Archives of Texas A&M University acquired Basbanes' papers as the Nicholas A. Basbanes Collection in December 2015. The collection includes archives of Basbanes' professional career as an author and literary journalist, as well as a significant portion of his personal library. Highlights of the collection include research materials related to the writing of his nine books and approximately eight hundred books inscribed to him over the course of his career.

Two selections of his literary journalism were collected in Editions & Impressions (2007) and About the Author (2010).

His collection of books resides in North Grafton, Massachusetts.

Bibliography 

A Gentle Madness: Bibliophiles, Bibliomanes, and the Eternal Passion for Books, New York: Henry Holt & Co., 1995.; Durham, NC: Fine Books Press, 2012 (updated print edition, and first electronic edition)
Patience & Fortitude: A Roving Chronicle of Book People, Book Places, and Book Culture, New York: HarperCollins, 2001 (
Among the Gently Mad: Perspectives and Strategies for the Book-Hunter in the 21st Century, New York: Henry Holt & Co., 2002 (
A Splendor of Letters: The Permanence of Books in an Impermanent World, New York: HarperCollins, 2003
Every Book its Reader: The Power of the Printed Word to Stir the World, New York: HarperCollins, 2005
Editions & Impressions: Twenty Years on the Book Beat, Durham, N.C.: Fine Books Press, 2007
A World of Letters: Yale University Press, 1908-2008, New Haven: Yale University Press, 2008
About the Author: Inside the Creative Process, Durham, NC: Fine Books Press, 2010
On Paper: The Everything of Its Two-Thousand-Year History, New York: Alfred A. Knopf, 2013
Cross of Snow: A Life of Henry Wadsworth Longfellow, New York: Alfred A. Knopf, 2020

Selected journalism and op-ed essays 
"Bibliophilia: Still No Cure in Sight", New York Times, April 14, 1991.
"Fragile Guardians of Culture", Los Angeles Times, January 12, 2004. 
"A Bitter End for Hub Gem", Boston Globe, Feb. 29. 2004.
"Honorable Death for a Rusty Warrior", Los Angeles Times, May 6, 2004.
"Bibliophiles Inside the Wire", Los Angeles Times, April 24, 2006.
"Iraq: The Cradle of the Written Word", Christian Science Monitor, May 8, 2006.
"When We Said Goodbye to the USS Oriskany", Christian Science Monitor, May 26, 2006.
"Famous Once Again", Smithsonian, February 2007.
"The Bard Out Loud", Bates Magazine, June 2007, reprinted from The Book That Changed My Life: 71 Remarkable Writers Celebrate the Books That Matter Most to Them (Gotham, 2006).
"The Paper Trail: Hand Papermaking in China", Fine Books & Collections, March/April 2008.
"A Paperless Society? Not So Fast." Los Angeles Times, December 8, 2013. 
"Paper Trail" Humanities, January/February 2014, Volume 35, Number 1.
"Summer Camp for Book Nerds" Humanities, November/December 2014, Volume 35, Number 6.
"High Spots in Human Progress" Fine Books & Collections, December 2014.
"A Romantic Notion: One Scholar's Lifetime of Devotion to the Letters of Robert Browning and Elizabeth Barrett Browning" Humanities, September/October 2015 | Volume 36, Number 5.
"A Dante Devotee" Fine Books & Collections, Summer 2016.
“On the Gentle Madness of Bibliophilia in the Modern Age” Livemint, April 12, 2019.
" 'The Hunt for History' Review: A Textual Detective" Wall Street Journal, March 14, 2020
"A Beautiful Ending"Humanities, Summer 2020, Volume 41, Issue 3.
"The Grooming of a Harvard Hispanist: George Ticknor’s Mentorship of Henry Wadsworth Longfellow"Observatorio, Instituto Cervantes at the Faculty of Arts and Sciences of Harvard University, February 3, 2023.

References

External links 
Works by or about Nicholas Basbanes in libraries (WorldCat Identities)
Basbanes profile onC-SPAN
Boston Athenæum Author Profile
American Writers Museum Advisory Council
Library Thing Profile
Pradeep Sebastian,"Endpaper: Scroll Down Memory Lane", The Hindu, August 31, 2013
William A. Davis, "Bible for Bibliophiles: Basbanes' 'A Gentle Madness' Confounds the Naysayers". Boston Globe, June 26, 1996, reprinted Bates Magazine, Spring 1997.
John Baker, "A Mania for Books", Publishers Weekly, vol. 252, issue 45, November 11, 2005.
William F.Meehan III,"First Impression: An Interview with Author and Bibliophile Nicholas A. Basbanes", Indiana Libraries, volume 25, number 3, 2006.
Michael M. Jones,"Reamed Out: PW Talks with Nicholas A. Basbanes," Publishers Weekly,  August 23, 2013.
Bob Minzesheimer,"Five Great Books about Libraries", USA Today, May 8, 2013.
Helen Gallagher, "On Paper: The Everything of Its Two-Thousand-Year History," New York Journal of Books, October 15, 2013.
Ron Charles, "Nicholas Basbanes on the Enduring Importance of Paper," The Washington Post, The Style Blog, October 28, 2013. 
Imprints and Impressions: Milestones in Human Progress, Exhibition of the Rarest Books in the World at the University of Dayton, October 2, 2014.
Sohn JiAe, Korea.net, "Hanji Traditional Paper Beloved Around the World," December 22, 2014. 
Stephanie McFeeters,The Boston Globe, Names, "Local Writers Will Share National Endowment for the Humanities Grant," July 29, 2015. 
Michael Schaub, Los Angeles Times, Jacket Copy, "Academic Nonfiction for the Masses? NEH Awards $1.7 million in Public Scholar grants," July 29, 2015.
Michael S. Rosenwald, Washington Post, Local, "Take note: The Paper Industry is Planning a Big Comeback," July 29, 2015.
“Cross of Snow: A Life of Henry Wadsworth Longfellow,” Publishers Weekly, April 9, 2020.
Christoph Irmscher, The Wall Street Journal, Books/Bookshelf, "‘Cross of Snow’ Review: Our Poet of Loneliness," May 22, 2020.  
Charles McGrath, The New York Times, Nonfiction, "Henry Wadsworth Longfellow: America's No. 1 Literary Celebrity," June 4, 2020.
Michael Dirda, The Washington Post, Books Review, "Beloved, patriotic, sentimental: A look at the life and poetry of Henry Wadsworth Longfellow," June 3, 2020.
James Marcus, The New Yorker, Books, "What is There to Love About Longfellow?," June 8 & 15, 2020 Issue. 
Herman Sutter, Library Journal, "Cross of Snow: A Life of Henry Wadsworth Longfellow," June 2020. 
 Publishers Weekly, "Cross of Snow: A Life of Henry Wadsworth Longfellow," April 9, 2020. 
BBC Sounds, Free Thinking, "Paper: An Exploration of the Cultural and Social History of Paper," January 19, 2022.  
Boston Athenaeum, Nicholas Basbanes in conversation with Andrew Pettegree and Arthur der Weduwen about their book "The Library: A Fragile History," January 21, 2022.   
Foreword to The Quotable Book Lover, edited by Ben Jacobs and Helena Hjalmarsson (New York: The Lyons Press, 1999). The quotations in Chapter 10, "Collecting Books: A Special Section by Nicholas A. Basbanes, " pp. 209–228, were compiled from A Gentle Madness.
Introduction to Robert A. Wilson, Modern Book Collecting, a new edition (New York: Skyhorse Publishing Co., 2010)
Nicholas A. Basbanes,"The Evening Star and the Bobby Baker Story: A Case Study,"  Thesis (M.A.), Pennsylvania State University.

Lectures 

November 14, 2013, the Strand bookstore in New York City, "Nicholas Basbanes on the Strange and Fascinating History of People and Paper," 
October 12, 2015, Book Club of California, San Francisco, "Material Culture and the Writing of a Dual Biography,"
August 30, 2017, Bowdoin College, Brunswick, Maine, "On Materiality: A Cultural Consideration of Paper," 
October 7, 2017, Longfellow House, Cambridge, Massachusetts, The 2017 James M. Shea Lecture presented in celebration of the 200th birthday of Fanny Appleton Longfellow,
July 13, 2020, Bowdoin College, Brunswick, Maine, "A Conversation with Nicholas Basbanes on Henry Wadsworth Longfellow," 

1943 births
Living people
American non-fiction writers
Writers from Worcester, Massachusetts
Writers from Lowell, Massachusetts
Bates College alumni
Pennsylvania State University alumni
American people of Greek descent
American male journalists
Public orators
United States Navy officers
United States Navy personnel of the Vietnam War
Book collecting
Military personnel from Massachusetts